Adolf Weissenberg (1790–1840) (sometimes named as Anton or Weissenburg) was a Bavarian architect and archaeologist. He was appointed by Otto of Greece as ephor of antiquities, overseeing all archaeology and archaeological sites in Greece, in 1833, but forced to resign in September 1834.

Career 

In 1833, Weissenberg was appointed as 'Ephor of Antiquities' with responsibility for 'the conservation, discovery and collection of the archaeological treasures of the kingdom'. Three others were appointed with the title of 'sub-ephor': Kyriakos Pittakis, for central and northern Greece; Ludwig Ross, for the Peloponnese, and Ioannis Kokkonis for the Aegean Islands.

On 1 February 1834, Weissenberg was appointed to lead the Greek Archaeological Service, which had notionally been established by Governor Ioannis Kapodistrias in 1829 but lacked a formal administrative structure until then. Weissenberg's short tenure saw the passage of the Archaeological Law of 10/22 May 1834, which named all antiquities in Greece as the 'national property of all the Greeks', asserted the ownership of the state over all archaeological sites not already on private land and created the core administrative structure of the Archaeological Service.

Ross, who succeeded Weissenberg as head of the Archaeological Service, accused him of lacking interest in antiquities, and Weissenberg was sacked (along with Kokkonis) in September 1834. He had also fallen foul of Josef Ludwig von Armansperg, head of the regency council, by trying to organise opposition to his government alongside Georg Ludwig von Maurer, who was also recalled to Bavaria. In Weissenberg's stead, Ross was named as Ephor General of Antiquities, with Pittakis and Athanasios Iatridis as his assistants.

References

Bibliography 
 
 
 
 

 1790 births
 1840 deaths
Archaeologists from Bavaria
Archaeology of Greece
History of Greece (1832–1862)